Osman Hadžikić (born 12 March 1996) is an Austrian professional footballer of Bosnian descent, who plays as a goalkeeper.

Club career
Hadžikić came through Austria Wien youth setup, having debuted for the first team on 11 April 2015 against Grödig, aged only 19.

International career
Hadžikić represents Austria under-21, having previously played for Austria under-19, but also has Bosnian citizenship and is eligible to play for Bosnia and Herzegovina.

Personal life
Osman has a younger brother, Nihad, who is also a footballer.

Career statistics

Club

References

1996 births
Living people
People from Klosterneuburg
Austrian people of Bosnia and Herzegovina descent
Austrian footballers
Austrian expatriate footballers
Austria youth international footballers
Austria under-21 international footballers
FK Austria Wien players
FC Zürich players
NK Inter Zaprešić players
FC Admira Wacker Mödling players
Austrian Regionalliga players
Austrian Football Bundesliga players
Croatian Football League players
Association football goalkeepers
Footballers from Lower Austria
Austrian expatriate sportspeople in Switzerland
Austrian expatriate sportspeople in Croatia
Expatriate footballers in Switzerland
Expatriate footballers in Croatia